James Robert Golka (born September 22, 1966) is an American prelate of the Roman Catholic Church who has been serving as bishop for the Diocese of Colorado Springs in Colorado since 2021.

Biography

Early life 
James Golka was born on September 22, 1966, in Grand Island, Nebraska, one of ten children of Robert and Patricia Golka. He attended Grand Island Central Catholic High School, where he played football.  During his time at Creighton University in Omaha, Nebraska,  Golka began talking about going into the priesthood with the Jesuits. After graduating from college, he spent a year volunteering at a high school in the Pine Ridge Indian Reservation in South Dakota in what he called a test of his desire to become a priest.

Priesthood 
On June 3, 1994, Golka was ordained to the priesthood for the Diocese of Grand Island by Bishop Lawrence McNamara. Along with parish assignments as parochial vicar and pastor,  Golka served as director of ongoing formation of clergy, director of diocesan youth retreats, chair of the Federation of Diocesan Liturgical Commission, chair of the Personnel Board, member of the Diocesan Finance Council, the Presbyteral Council, and the Pension Board. Golka's last pastoral assignment before becoming bishop was as rector and pastor of the Cathedral of the Nativity of the Blessed Virgin Mary in Grand Island.

Bishop of Colorado Springs 
Pope Francis appointed Golka as bishop for the Diocese of Colorado Springs on April 30, 2021.  On June 29, 2021, Golka was consecrated by Archbishop Samuel J. Aquila.

See also

 Catholic Church hierarchy
 Catholic Church in the United States
 Historical list of the Catholic bishops of the United States
 List of Catholic bishops of the United States
 Lists of patriarchs, archbishops, and bishops

References

External links
Roman Catholic Diocese of Colorado Springs Official Site 
Roman Catholic Diocese of Grand Island Official Site

Episcopal succession

  

1966 births
Living people
People from Grand Island, Nebraska
American Roman Catholic bishops by contiguous area of the United States
Roman Catholic bishops of Colorado Springs
Bishops appointed by Pope Francis